Zoran Zorkic (born Zoran Zorkić; September 5, 1966) is a Serbian American professional golfer who played on the Nationwide Tour. Zorkic joined the Nationwide Tour in 2000. He won the SAS Carolina Classic in 2002, his only victory on Tour. He played on the Nationwide Tour until 2009. He won four events on the NGA Hooters Tour. He is currently a golf coach in Houston.

Professional wins (6)

PGA Tour of Australasia wins (1)

Buy.com Tour wins (1)

Other wins (4)
Four wins on the NGA Hooters Tour

Results in major championships

CUT = missed the half-way cut
Note: Zorkic only played in the U.S. Open.

Team appearances
Amateur
Australian Men's Interstate Teams Matches (representing Queensland): 1985, 1986, 1988

External links

Serbian male golfers
American male golfers
Houston Cougars men's golfers
PGA Tour golfers
Golfers from Houston
Serbian emigrants to the United States
People from Bogdanovci
People from Kingwood, Texas
1966 births
Living people